Michael Gould may refer to:
Michael Gould (actor) (born 1961), English actor
Michael Gould (chief executive), American businessman
Michael C. Gould (born 1953), Superintendent of the United States Air Force Academy
Mick Gould (born 1930), Irish former Gaelic footballer
Michael Gould, founder and CTO of Anaplan